Ernest Choquin de Sarzec (1832–1901) was a French archaeologist, to whom is attributed the discovery of the civilization of ancient Sumer. He was in the French diplomatic service; on being transferred to Basra in 1872 as a vice-consul, he became interested in the excavations at Ur, started by the British diplomat J. E. Taylor.

In 1877, he began a dig at Telloh (the ancient Girsu, as it transpired, rather than Lagash as once supposed). The site, in present-day Iraq in the southern delta lowlands, had been drawn to his attention by local dealers in antiquities. During the 1880s he succeeded in finding evidence of the reign of Gudea. He continued to work on the site until 1901.

References

External links 
 Ernest de Sarzec on data.bnf.fr

French archaeologists
French Assyriologists
Officiers of the Légion d'honneur
Scientists from Rennes
1832 births
1901 deaths
Assyriologists